Regina East was a federal electoral district in Saskatchewan, Canada, that was represented in the House of Commons of Canada from 1968 to 1988.

This riding was created in 1966 from parts of Humboldt—Melfort, Melville, Moose Jaw—Lake Centre, QuAppelle, Regina City and Yorkton ridings.

It was abolished in 1987 when it was redistributed into Regina—Qu'Appelle and Regina—Wascana ridings.

Election results

See also 

 List of Canadian federal electoral districts
 Past Canadian electoral districts

External links 

Former federal electoral districts of Saskatchewan